MDC United FC  (Malawi Development Corporation United Football Club) was an association football club based in Lilongwe, Central Region of Malawi. Established in 1976, the club were one of the founder members of the Super League of Malawi in 1986 season.

History 
The club was founded in 1976 in the capital Lilongwe as Berec Power Pack. 

On 2 June 1984, Berec Power Pack lifted the Kamuzu Cup after coming from behind to beat CIVO United 3–2. 

In the 1987–88 season, MDC United, under coach Henry Moyo, won the Super League championship and became the first team in Malawi to clinch the league title without losing any game.

The club remained in the top flight until the 2004 season after club officials announced the disappearance of the team due to sponsorship problems.

At an international level, he participated in a continental tournament, in the 1993 CAF Cup, where he was eliminated in the first round by South African 
club Hellenic FC.

Honours 
Super League of Malawi 
 Winners: (1) 1988
 Runners-up (1): 1999–2000

Performance in CAF competitions

Former players 
  Frank Sinalo
  Heston Munthali

References

External links 
 footballdatabase.eu
 worldfootball.net
 weltfussballarchiv.com
 Champion List

Defunct football clubs in Malawi
 Association football clubs established in 1976
 Association football clubs disestablished in 2004
1976 establishments in Malawi
2004 disestablishments in Malawi
 Lilongwe